At the 1994 Winter Olympics, fifteen Nordic skiing events were contested – ten cross-country skiing events, three ski jumping events, and two Nordic combined events. The program of events was unchanged from the previous Games two years earlier.

1994 Winter Olympics events
1994